East Dundee is a village in Kane County with a small section in Cook County.  The population was 3,152 at the 2020 census.

Geography

Demographics
As of the 2020 census there were 3,152 people, 1,453 households, and 850 families residing in the village. The racial makeup of the village was 74.08% White, 5.84% African American, 0.54% Native American, 2.44% Asian, 0.00% Pacific Islander, 7.93% from other races, and 9.17% from two or more races. Hispanic or Latino of any race were 18.08% of the population.

There were 1,453 households, out of which 23.06% had children under the age of 18 living with them, 42.46% were married couples living together, 9.57% had a female householder with no husband present, and 41.50% were non-families. 36.75% of all households were made up of individuals, and 26.98% had someone living alone who was 65 years of age or older. The average household size was 2.91 and the average family size was 2.21.

The village's age distribution consisted of 13.8% under the age of 18, 6.6% from 18 to 24, 23.4% from 25 to 44, 29.3% from 45 to 64, and 26.9% who were 65 years of age or older. The median age was 52.0 years. For every 100 females, there were 88.8 males. For every 100 females age 18 and over, there were 77.2 males.

The median income for a household in the village was $73,199, and the median income for a family was $91,591. Males had a median income of $64,575 versus $33,723 for females. The per capita income for the village was $52,929. About 7.5% of families and 10.4% of the population were below the poverty line, including 21.5% of those under age 18 and 8.6% of those age 65 or over.

Note: the US Census treats Hispanic/Latino as an ethnic category. This table excludes Latinos from the racial categories and assigns them to a separate category. Hispanics/Latinos can be of any race.

History
The village of East Dundee was incorporated in 1871, four years after West Dundee. A historic district along the Fox River and stores on Main Street constitute the commercial part of East Dundee. The historic feed and coal store became Dundee Lumber, which burned down in March 2007. A former railroad bed is now the Fox River Trail, which follows the east side of the Fox River through town. The train depot was rebuilt in 1984 as a tourist center. Santa's Village theme park operated from 1959 to 2006. It reopened in 2011 under new ownership as Santa's Village AZoosment Park.

DeLoris Doederlein, educator and politician, lived in East Dundee.

See also
 Dundee Township Historic District
 Haeger Potteries
 Santa's Village AZoosment Park

References

External links

Villages in Illinois
Villages in Kane County, Illinois
Villages in Cook County, Illinois
Chicago metropolitan area
Populated places established in 1834
1871 establishments in Illinois